Pollanisus trimacula is a moth of the family Zygaenidae. It is found in Australia in south-eastern Queensland and eastern parts of New South Wales.

The length of the forewings is 7.5–9.5 mm for males and 8–9 mm for females. There are probably two generations per year, with adults on wing in late summer and spring.

Larvae have been reared on Hibbertia scandens and Hibbertia dentata.

External links
Australian Faunal Directory
Zygaenid moths of Australia: a revision of the Australian Zygaenidae

Moths of Australia
trimacula
Moths described in 1854